Nowa Krosnowa  is a village in the administrative district of Gmina Słupia, within Skierniewice County, Łódź Voivodeship, in central Poland.

References

Nowa Krosnowa